Light a Light may refer to:

 "Light a Light", a song by Janis Ian on the album Between the Lines (1975)
 "Light a Light", a cover of the Janis Ian song by Joan Baez on Honest Lullaby (1979)
 "Light a Light", a cover of the Janis Ian song by Chyi Yu on Stories (1987)
 "Light a Light", a song by Melissa Etheridge on the album A New Thought for Christmas (2008)
 "Light a Light", a song by Jessica Mauboy and Brendon Boney on the soundtrack to Bran Nue Dae (2010)
 "Light a Light", a song by Sons of Bill on the album Love & Logic (2013)